The International Journal of Obesity (abbreviated as IJO) is a peer-reviewed medical journal published by the Nature Publishing Group. It was established in 1977 as International Journal of Obesity by Newman Pub. in collaboration with the Association for the Study of Obesity and the North American Association for the Study of Obesity. In 1992, the journal change its name to International Journal of Obesity and Related Metabolic Disorders upon acquisition by the Nature Publishing Group. In 2005, the journal returned to its original name.

Aims and scope 
The journal addresses the development and treatment of obesity, and the functional impairments associated with the obese state. It publishes basic science and clinical studies that address the biochemical, epidemiological, genetical, molecular, metabolic, nutritional, physiological, psychological and sociological aspects of obesity.

Abstracting and indexing 
International Journal of Obesity is indexed in the following databases:
 Elsevier BIOBASE
 BIOSIS
 Chemical Abstracts
 CINAHL
 Current Contents/Clinical Medicine 
 Current Contents/Life Sciences
 EMBASE
 MEDLINE
 SciSearch

According to the Journal Citation Reports, the journal had a 2020 impact factor of 5.095, ranking it 23rd out of 89 journals in the category "Nutrition & Dietetics" and 38th out of 145 journals in the category "Endocrinology & Metabolism".

See also 
 List of medical journals

References

External links 
 

English-language journals
Monthly journals
Nature Research academic journals
Nutrition and dietetics journals
Obesity journals
Publications established in 1977